William Oscar Jenkins (1878–1963) was an American businessman who made great wealth in Mexico. He was born May 18, 1878 in Shelbyville, Tennessee. He was originally a mechanic who moved to Mexico. He served during the Mexican Revolution as a minor consular official at Puebla, Mexico. While serving as consul, he was kidnapped by revolutionary forces and held for ransom. Once released he was arrested for allegedly arranging the kidnapping, but he was never convicted of such actions. He was active by turns in hosiery, sugar, theaters and banking.

See also
William O. Jenkins House

References

Sources
Time Magazine: Meet Mr. Jenkins (subscription required)
Account of siege of Puebla by William O. Jenkins
The Mexico Reader: History, Culture, Politics. Edited by Gilbert M. Joseph and Timothy J. Henderson 

1878 births
1963 deaths
American expatriates in Mexico
People from Shelbyville, Tennessee